Olta may refer to:

People
 Olta Boka (born 1991), Albanian singer
 Olta Xhaçka (born 1979), Albanian politician

Places
 Olta, Argentina